Alexander Wassa (born 13 March 1963) is an Indonesian boxer. He competed in the men's featherweight event at the 1984 Summer Olympics.

References

External links
 

1963 births
Living people
Indonesian male boxers
Olympic boxers of Indonesia
Boxers at the 1984 Summer Olympics
Place of birth missing (living people)
Featherweight boxers
20th-century Indonesian people